Christmas with The Jets is the second studio album by Tongan-American family band The Jets, released on November 30th, 1986, by MCA Records. It is also their first and only Christmas album to date.

Although a single from this album was not released at the time, "Christmas In My Heart" would appear on the B-side of their single, "Anytime", two years later in 1988.  Noted tracks include "Somewhere Out There" from the animated film An American Tail (1986) which was also recorded and released by Linda Ronstadt and James Ingram at the same time to become a hit for the duo a few months later in 1987.  Rupert Holmes penned "Christmas In My Heart" and would soon work with The Jets again with "You Got It All" as well as the previously mentioned "Anytime".

Track listing
"This Christmas" – 4:08 (Charles Fotson Davis III, Bob Marsh, Jerry Marsh, Robert Marsh, Don Powell) Lead vocal: Haini 
"Christmas in My Heart" – 4:16 (Holly Dunn, John Rosasco) Lead vocal: Elizabeth
"All Alone on Christmas" – 2:31 (K. Tucker) Lead vocal: LeRoy
"On Christmas Night" – 3:02 (The Jets, Pamela Phillips-Oland) Lead vocal: Moana
"I'm Home For Christmas" – 3:13 (Pamela Phillips-Oland, Peter Leinbeiser) Lead vocal: Eugene
"Somewhere Out There" – 3:56 (James Horner, Barry Mann, Cynthia Weil) Lead vocal: Eugene, Moana
"Love So Rare" – 2:58 (The Jets, Pamela Phillips-Oland) Lead vocal: LeRoy
"Christmas Is My Favorite Time of Year" – 2:05 (Pete McCann) Lead vocal: Moana
"You Make It Christmas" – 3:35 (Rupert Holmes) Lead vocal: Rudy
"This Christmas, This Year" – 2:50 (David Lasley, Willie Wilcox) Lead vocal: Elizabeth

Personnel
LeRoy Wolfgramm – vocals
Eddie Wolfgramm – vocals 
Eugene Wolfgramm – vocals
Haini Wolfgramm – vocals 
Rudy Wolfgramm – vocals 
Kathi Wolfgramm – vocals 
Elizabeth Wolfgramm – vocals 
Moana Wolfgramm – vocals 

The Jets (band) albums
1986 Christmas albums
Christmas albums by American artists
Contemporary R&B Christmas albums
Pop Christmas albums
RCA Records Christmas albums